Shot peening can be used to recondition distorted steel conveyor belts. The shot peening process is quick and cost-effective compared with other methods and does not interrupt daily production. A deformed steel belt has the following disadvantages:

Exerts uneven pressure on the product,
Can cause steel belt tracking problems in the press,
The steel belt is exposed to unnecessary high stress,
Increases the risk of accidental damage to the edge of the belt,
Overall reduces the life span of the steel belt.

The shot peening process 
Shot peening is a maintenance process for flattening a deformed steel belt in which the surface of the belt is impacted by small spherical stainless steel or carbon steel balls called peening shot. Each shot hitting the belt functions as a small peening hammer, forming a small indentation or dimple on the steel belt surface. In order for the indentation to be formed, the steel belt surface layer must yield in tension. The compressed grains help to restore the surface to its original shape by producing a hemisphere of cold-worked metal highly stressed in compression. Overlapping indentations create a continuous layer of residual compressive stress. It is well known that cracks will not lead up nor propagate in a compressive stressed zone. Because nearly all fatigue and stress corrosion failures originate at the surface of a part, compressive stresses generate by shot peening provide very important increases in life time. Note that:
 Although it's possible to peen whilst the press is in production great care must be taken to ensure that is no loss of shot which would find its way into the finished panel or the press system. 
 The belt is run at a speed of 15–20 ft/min to start with, but this may be increased if leveling is taking satisfactorily. The faster the belt runs, the less effective is the peening process in a given time. 
 Start with a low pressure (20 psi) and work up in steps of 10 psi until a noticeable effect is seen in the belt curve. For a precipitation hardened type stainless steel belt the required pressure could be as high as 90 psi. 
 If the shot becomes contaminated with oil from the belt it becomes less effective as a blasting medium, and the oil also clogs the air blast system. If oil pick-up is unavoidable then frequent cleaning of the equipment and washing of the shot will be required.  
 Always peen against a solid surface 
 Peening is started from the centre of a section and progresses towards the edge. Several light passes across the belt are less likely to over-compress the surface than one heavy pass which could distort the belt in the opposite direction.
 Peening must be applied to the concave side of a curve to stretch the metal on the 'short' side.

Portable shot blasting unit

The main use of the unit is to flatten out deformed press belts whilst simultaneously stress-relieving the belt material. The small size and low weight makes the unit flexible to use and easy to bring into and operate in field situations. All of the equipment needed (excluding the carriage frame and the air compressor) can be packed into a box with dimensions of about: 350mm L × 350mm W × 320 mm. Total weight including blaster, valve, air hose and miscellaneous components is around 25 kg and the blasting machine itself weights only 9 kg. One pair of universal channel (38 mm * 76 mm) must be provided on site – the length usually being 500 mm longer than the belt width. The channels are welded together so that the blaster can easily run through the frame across the face of the belt. The total installation time, including the manufacture of the carriage frame, is limited to just a few hours after which the peening process can begin. On the inlet air hose an electric shut-off valve is mounted to protect the belt from over-blasting should the belt suddenly stop during the blasting operation. To be effective the valve solenoid must be connected / interlocked to the press machine's power supply (240 V). For best blasting results an air supply of 4200 litres per minute is required at a pressure of 6 bar. A flexible air hose is supplied with the unit which is to be connected between the blasting unit and the local air supply. All local supply pipes should have a minimum bore diameter of 1 inch. The recommended shot blasting medium is tungsten shot (beads) with diameter ranging from 0.2 to 0.4 mm having a hardness exceeding 40 HRC. The machine operates by drawing a quantity of tungsten shot from the bottom of the scroll case into the high-velocity nozzles. The shot is blasted onto the surface of the belt, and most of the shot bounces back into the scroll case. The air is vented through the filter socks, and any shot carried with the air is filtered out and drops back into the scroll case.

Flattening out deformed belts

Historically (per 1980s), the common method previously used to solve the problem of deformed belts was to turn the belt over i.e. what was previously the back of the belt is then used to form the new product side. The belt became flatter being turned because of an equalization of the stresses on the two sides.

However, the belt usually continues to change its shape so that it eventually acquires the same shape as before being turned but in the opposite direction. 
Because of this, turning the belt again after a period of approximately one year was often necessary. This method is very time-consuming and thus very costly since it involves cutting the belt, dismantling it from the press, turning the belt and re-installing it in the press followed by the belt joining operations (welding and grinding of the joint) and running-in procedures. All these operations also require equipment for handling the belt as well as special welding jigs and skilled personnel for the joint-welding. Added to this is the loss of production during the operation – a stoppage in production of one week being not uncommon. The steel belt shot peening process was developed as a superior solution to the Belt cross curvature problem.

Shot peening